Wine corks are a stopper used to seal wine bottles. They are typically made from cork (bark of the cork oak), though synthetic materials can be used. Common alternative wine closures include screw caps and glass stoppers. 68 percent of all cork is produced for wine bottle stoppers.

Corks are manufactured for still wines as well as sparkling wines; the latter are bottled under pressure, forcing the corks to take on a mushroom shape. They are fastened with a wire cage known as a muselet.

History

As late as the mid-17th century, French vintners did not use cork stoppers, using instead oil-soaked rags stuffed into the necks of bottles. The inventor of cork-based wine stoppers is unknown. Colloquial stories attribute the Benedictine monk Dom Pérignon. The stoppers date to about the 1600s. In the early 21st century, the problem of cork taint became prevalent, leading many producers to stop using corks in favor of alternatives. Screw caps became especially prominent in Australia and New Zealand by 2010. Most cork was sourced from around the Mediterranean Basin, far from the Oceanian countries.

Following issues with cork taint, the cork industry invested in new techniques and equipment, reducing TCA chemicals in wine by 95 percent. Cork producers began promoting the cork's environmental and economic benefits.

Production

Like other cork products, natural wine corks are derived from the bark of cork oak trees. The bark is carefully peeled away and cut into sheets before processing. The oak trees are not cut down, and only about half of its bark is removed at any time. Cork oaks are first harvested at 25 years old, and take place every 9 years. After the third harvest, the bark is of sufficient quality for producing wine corks.

Portugal is the largest producer of corks, at 52.5 percent, followed by Spain, Italy, and Algeria. The majority of Portugal's production is in the region of Alentejo, at 72 percent of national production. 68 percent of all cork is produced for wine bottle stoppers.

Products
Corks can be made in several ways:

 Natural cork stoppers are made from a single piece of bark, and have the best flexibility, keeping the seal strong for aging wine for over 5 years.
 Colmated corks are made from a single piece of bark, but have pores filled with glue and cork dust. They are easier to remove from a bottle, and are good for medium aging.
 Multi-piece corks have two or more pieces glued together. They are denser than single-piece corks, and are not good for prolonged aging.
 Agglomerated corks are made of cork dust and glue, and are dense, inexpensive, and not good for sealing wine for over a year.
 Technical corks are agglomerated corks with single pieces of cork on either end.

Attributes

Cork stoppers are moisture-resistant, are slow to deteriorate, they help wine age, and provide a waterproof seal. The stoppers are associated with a perception of high quality wine, especially as cheaper alternatives are common with lower-cost wine.

Because of the cellular structure of cork, it is easily compressed upon insertion into a bottle and will expand to form a tight seal. The interior diameter of the neck of glass bottles tends to be inconsistent, making this ability to seal through variable contraction and expansion an important attribute.  However, unavoidable natural flaws, channels, and cracks in the bark make the cork itself highly inconsistent. In a 2005 closure study, 45% of corks showed gas leakage during pressure testing both from the sides of the cork as well as through the cork body itself.

A study conducted by PricewaterhouseCoopers and commissioned by the major cork manufacturer Amorim concluded that cork is the most environmentally responsible stopper, in a one-year life cycle analysis comparison with plastic stoppers and aluminum screw caps.

Reuse

Wine corks cannot be reused as wine corks due to bacterial concerns, but they can be recycled into many other useful objects such as corkboards, coasters, flooring and used for all kinds of craft projects. While many synthetic corks can be  at home, natural corks can either be composted or recycled at specific stores. Companies partner with stores to accept used corks and recycle them into other products; ReCork is the largest of these companies in the United States. Corks can also be recycled through Cork Forest Conservation Alliance.

Types

Still wine
Lengths vary, usually based on length of time estimated to age the wine.

Sparkling wine

When pushed into the bottle, the corks are compressed to about 60–70 percent of their original diameters. The corks are held in place by wire cages known as muselets.

Sparkling wine corks are mostly built from three sections and are referred to as agglomerated corks. The mushroom shape that occurs in the transition is a result of the bottom section's being composed of two stacked discs of pristine cork cemented to the upper portion, which is a conglomerate of ground cork and glue. The bottom section is in contact with the wine. Before insertion, a sparkling wine cork is almost 50% larger than the opening of the bottle. Originally, the cork starts as a cylinder and is compressed before insertion into the bottle. Over time, their compressed shape becomes more permanent and the distinctive "mushroom" shape becomes more apparent.

The aging of the wine post-disgorgement can to some degree be told by the cork, as, the longer it has been in the bottle, the less it returns to its original cylinder shape.

See also
 Corkscrew

References

External links
 

Wine packaging and storage